Coleshill Auxiliary Research Team (CART) is a network of British historians.
It is named after Coleshill in Oxfordshire where Winston Churchill had arranged for a group of soldiers, called Auxiliary Units, to spend their time, developing guerrilla war tactics for in the event of a Nazi invasion of England during World War II. CART as it is known is the largest group in the UK researching this army and have put together a national database listing the 3,500 men.

Conservative MP Justin Tomlinson has said of CART, "I fully support CART’s mission to honour their bravery. Their vital work should remain secret no longer."

References

External links

British Resistance Archive

British historians